The Bridge of Sighs in Cambridge, England is a stone covered bridge at St John's College, Cambridge. It was built in 1831 and crosses the River Cam between the college's Third Court and New Court. The architect was Henry Hutchinson.
It is named after the Bridge of Sighs in Venice, although they have little architecturally in common beyond the fact that they are both covered bridges with arched bases. The bridge, a Grade I listed building, is a Cambridge attraction and Queen Victoria is said to have loved it more than any other spot in the city.

History
In the early 19th century, St. John's College added accommodation on the west side of the River Cam, an area known as the Backs, with the construction of New Court. The new buildings and the bridge linking them with the original college buildings were designed in 1827 by Henry Hutchinson in the fashionable Gothic Revival style. Construction was completed in 1831, shortly before his death.

On two occasions, students have pulled the prank of dangling a car under the bridge. In the first incident (in June 1963), a 1928 Austin 7 was punted down the river using four punts that had been lashed together, then hoisted up under the bridge using ropes. The second incident (in 1968) a Bond or Reliant Regal three-wheeler car was dangled under the bridge. In neither case was the bridge damaged.

The bridge was a favourite spot of former Singaporean Prime Minister Lee Kuan Yew, who had photos taken there in 1947 when he was a student upon Lee Hsien Loong's graduations in 1974 and 2000.

In popular culture
The bridge was a filming location for Elizabeth: The Golden Age in 2007 and The Theory of Everything in 2014. The bridge can also be seen in the music video for the song "High Hopes" by Pink Floyd.

See also
Bridge of Sighs, Oxford
List of bridges in Cambridge

References

External links

 Information at cambridge2000.com
 

St John's College, Cambridge
Bridges in Cambridge
Bridges completed in 1831
Covered bridges in England
Bridges across the River Cam
Pedestrian bridges in England
Buildings and structures of the University of Cambridge
Bridge of Sighs
Bridge of Sighs